Cirque du Freak (also known as Cirque du Freak: A Living Nightmare) is the first of twelve novels in The Saga of Darren Shan by Darren Shan (real name Darren O'Shaugnessy), published in January 2000.

A feature film adaptation of the novel, directed by Paul Weitz and starring Chris Massoglia, John C. Reilly, Ken Watanabe, Salma Hayek, Josh Hutcherson and Willem Dafoe was released on October 23, 2009.

References 

2000 Irish novels
The Saga of Darren Shan novels
HarperCollins books
Irish novels adapted into films